No temas al amor (English title: Don't be afraid of love) is a telenovela made by Mexican TV network Televisa. This telenovela was broadcast in 1980. This soap opera was televised on weekends only.

Plot
Alejandra (Daniela Romo) is a photographer who is afraid of the love from Raul Contreras (Enrique Novi), an orthopedist, because she is already engaged to Ernesto Millan, an incapacitated racing-driver. Marcos Dario (Armando Silvestre), the father of Alejandra, has a secret affair with Cristina (Chela Castro), the mother of Raul. Marcos Dario caused the financial ruin and suicide of Raul's father. Then Alejandra gets married and divorces Ernesto because he is rude and jealous. Cristina wants to take revenge on Marcos Dario for what happened on the past. Raul and Alejandra gets together, but he dies in a car accident and Alejandra will remain alone with their son.

Cast
 Daniela Romo as Alejandra
 Enrique Novi as Raul
 Armando Silvestre as Marcos Dario
 Chela Castro as Cristina
 Antonio Valencia as Gerardo
 Félix Santaella as Raymundo
 Ana Laura as Socky
 Ernesto Marin as Carlos
 Carmen Delgado as Marcela
 Ana Silvia Garza as Martha
 Dolores Marti as Marga
 Graciela Lara as Gabriela
 Maribel Fernández as Alicia
 Alfonso Kafitti as Alfonso
 Alejandro Ciangherotti Jr. as Jacinto

References

External links 
 

1980 telenovelas
Mexican telenovelas
Spanish-language telenovelas
Televisa telenovelas
1980 Mexican television series debuts
1980 Mexican television series endings